was a Japanese samurai who served the Mōri clan.

Mōri retainers
Samurai
1568 deaths
Year of birth unknown